Hermanson is a surname. Notable people with the surname include:

Albert Hermanson (1881–1960), Swedish-born Canadian farmer and politician
Dustin Hermanson (born 1972), American baseball player
Elwin Hermanson (born 1952), Canadian politician
Marie Hermanson (born 1956), Swedish writer and journalist
Phil Hermanson (born 1965), American politician

See also
Mount Hermanson, mountain of Antarctica
Hermannsson
Hermansen
Hermansson